The 2020–21 Korvpalli Meistriliiga (KML) season, also known as PAF Korvpalli Meistriliiga for sponsorship reasons, was the 95th season of the top-tier basketball league in Estonia.

The play-offs began on 19 April 2021 and ended on 17 May with BC Kalev/Cramo defeating Pärnu Sadam in the finals for their 12th Estonian Championship.

Teams

Venues and locations

Personnel and sponsorship

Coaching changes

Regular season

Team standings are calculated as follows:
Four rounds of Estonian-Latvian Basketball League regular season games.
Two rounds of Korvpalli Meistriliiga regular season games.
BC Kalev/Cramo's Estonian-Latvian Basketball League third and fourth round games are counted twice.
Any games postponed and not rearranged until 17 April 2021 are cancelled and regular season standings are determined by winning percentage.

League table
</noinclude></onlyinclude>

Results

Playoffs

The play-offs began on 19 April and ended on 17 May. The tournament concluded with BC Kalev/Cramo defeating Pärnu Sadam three games to one in the finals.

Bracket
</onlyinclude>

Awards

Finals Most Valuable Player
 Chavaughn Lewis (BC Kalev/Cramo)

Best Young Player
 Hugo Toom (Pärnu Sadam)

Best Defender
 Märt Rosenthal (Pärnu Sadam)

Coach of the Year
 Roberts Štelmahers (BC Kalev/Cramo)

All-KML Team

See also
 2020–21 Latvian–Estonian Basketball League
 2020–21 VTB United League
 2020–21 Basketball Champions League
 2020–21 FIBA Europe Cup

References

External links
Official website 

Korvpalli Meistriliiga seasons
Estonian
KML